Támás Benkő is a Hungarian sprint canoer who competed in the late 1970s. He won a bronze medal in the K-4 10000 m at the 1979 ICF Canoe Sprint World Championships in Duisburg.

References

Hungarian male canoeists
Living people
Year of birth missing (living people)
ICF Canoe Sprint World Championships medalists in kayak